Guy Leech (born 29 February 1964) is a former Australian Ironman surf lifesaving champion. Now retired from formal competition, he won seven Uncle Toby's Super Series races and twice won The Coolangatta Gold. Leech remained undefeated over surf's toughest event and in 1989 won the Uncle Toby's version titled the "Gold Coast Gold" which made it his third victory over that distance. By 1989 the sport had now gone professional, making the field assembled for the 1989 race far more elite than when he had won in 1984 and 1985. He also won the World Ironman Championships in Vancouver, Canada, in 1986 and the World Ocean Paddling Championship in Hawaii in 1994. Leech was once dubbed Australia's Fittest Athlete by the Australian Institute of Sport (1993).

In 1994, Leech retired from surf Iron Man and turned his attention to triathlon. Years of being involved in a sport which was mostly upper-body made it difficult for him to adapt to triathlon and due to this he was never competitive. He retired from professional sport in 1995.

Since retiring, Leech has made many false claims about his career. Some of these include claims that he was never beaten in a two hour Ironman race which is completely false. Guy Andrews, Darren Mercer, Trevor Hendy and others all beat him in long course races (of approximately two hours) during his career. Some of these races are available to be viewed on Youtube. He has also made the outrageous claim that there were 250 000 people on the beach to see him win the Coolangatta Gold. This would be impossible considering that the Gold Coast's entire population in 1984 would have been less than that amount. In actual fact there would have been about three or four thousand people on the beach that day. 

It should also be noted that in his career, Leech never won either a Nurti Grain or Uncle Tobys series despite winning several races. He also never won a national Ironman championship despite attempting to for a decade.

In 2006, Leech appeared on the Seven Network's Australian Celebrity Survivor: Vanuatu, the second edition of Australian Survivor. He and 11 other celebrities were vying for a cash prize of A$100,000 to be donated to their nominated charity. Leech was initially voted out sixth (i.e. seventh place in the game) and his charity, Ride Aid Inc; however, he returned to the game along with Justin Melvey due to a twist to the show which took Leech to the finals. Ultimately Leech won, taking home an extra A$95000 for his charity. The money was used to build two schools in North Cambodia. In 2020 he was inducted into the inaugural Australian Survivor Hall Of Fame.

Leech still trains daily, and delivers training sessions with paddling and cross-training strength exercises.

Personal life
Leech is married and has two daughters living in Sydney's Northern Beaches.

References

External links
 

1960s births
Living people
Australian male triathletes
Australian surf lifesavers
Winners in the Survivor franchise
Survivor (franchise) winners
People from the North Shore, Sydney
Australian Survivor contestants